Cryptolechia bibundella is a moth in the family Depressariidae. It was described by Strand in 1913. It is found in Cameroon.

References

Endemic fauna of Cameroon
Moths described in 1913
Cryptolechia (moth)